Behind the Attraction is a documentary TV series by Brian Volk-Weiss for Disney+ produced by Dwayne Johnson's Seven Bucks Productions and Volk-Weiss's The Nacelle Company. The first five episodes were released on July 21, 2021, with the remaining five being released on August 25 of that same year.

Premise 
The series explores the history of how popular Disney attractions and destinations came to be, how they have changed over time and how fans continue to obsess over them. It features many interviews with fans and Imagineers.

Episodes

Production 
In October 2019, Disney+ ordered the docu-series from The Toys That Made Us's creator and director Brian Volk-Weiss, with his production company The Nacelle Company and Dwayne Johnson's Seven Bucks Productions attached as production houses.

In December 2021, Hiram Garcia confirmed plans to develop a season two for the series.

Release 
All episodes of Behind the Attraction were initially scheduled to premiere on Disney+ on July 16, 2021. However, after the success of the premiere of Loki on a Wednesday, it was announced that drop days for most original Disney+ series would be moved to Wednesdays. As a result, the series premiered instead with its first five episodes on July 21, 2021. The remaining five episodes premiered on August 25, 2021.

Reception 
On Rotten Tomatoes, the series holds an approval rating of 75% based on 8 reviews, with an average rating of 7.50/10.

Monica Encarnacion of Common Sense Media rated the series 4 out of 5 stars, praised the depiction of positive messages, citing creativity, perseverance, and teamwork, and complimented the discussion of role models through the series, mentioning Walt Disney, George Lucas, and Dwayne Johnson as forward-looking visionaries. Adam Chitwood of Collider gave the series a "B+" rating and compared the series to The Imagineering Story, stating that while Behind the Attraction provides less detail than the former, it succeeds to offer an entertaining retrospective on Disney's attractions, claiming it motivates its audience to go to Disney's parks.

Controversy 
On September 16, 2021, a statement of alleged plagiarism was raised to episode 4 of the series regarding the Twilight Zone: Tower of Terror. A Canadian YouTube channel called Art of Engineering pointed out several undeniable similarities to their original artwork and animations (showing the ride's interpreted interior layout) created by Art of Engineering and used in "How Disney's Tower of Terror Works" that was published on YouTube in 2019. Not only are the animations used in the Disney+ series a near perfect trace of the 2019 diagrams, but other fans pointed out the series' odd use of an orange background may allegedly indicate awareness of the parallels to the channel's 2019 work and an attempt to conceal the act as, throughout the rest of the episode, a more standard blue background was utilized. Neither Disney nor Seven Bucks Productions, the company responsible for the series, have commented on the matter, but internet reaction and US law seem to heavily be in favor of the original 2019 work.

As of September 21, 2021, the matter was resolved and Brian Volk-Weiss "offered a genuine apology on behalf of Disney, Nacelle and Seven Bucks Productions". The episode will be edited and Art of Engineering creator James St. Onge will be credited at the end of the episode.

See also
The Imagineering Story
The Toys That Made Us - similar in style and created by Brian Volk-Weiss

References

External links 
 
 

2020s American documentary television series
2021 American television series debuts
English-language television shows
Disney+ original programming
Television series by Disney
Documentary television series about industry
Works about Disney